The All-I'll-Ever-Want Christmas Doll is a 2007 picture book by Patricia McKissack and illustrated by Jerry Pinkney. It is about a girl, Nella, living during the Great Depression who amazingly receives a doll for Christmas, initially doesn't share with her sisters but then relents after discovering that it's not fun to play by herself.

Reception
School Library Journal, in a review of The All-I'll-Ever-Want Christmas Doll, wrote "McKissack's knack for combining historical detail with true-to-life family drama and language is shown to good effect, showcased beautifully by Pinkney's evocative watercolors, which give a real flavor of the time period." and concluded "Learning to appreciate what you have and to share what you get are two lessons that never go out of style." and Library Media Connection called it "a memorable book."

Booklist, Publishers Weekly and Kirkus Reviews gave starred reviews and commended Pinkey's illustrations. 

The All-I'll-Ever-Want Christmas Doll has also been reviewed by The Horn Book Magazine, and The New York Times.

Awards
2008 ALA Notable Children's Book
2008 CCBC Choice
2008 Charlotte Zolotow Award - highly commended
NCTE Picturebooks With Noteworthy Endpapers - recommended

References

2007 children's books
American picture books
Fictional dolls and dummies
Picture books by Jerry Pinkney
Christmas children's books
Books by Patricia McKissack